Stuart Palmer was an Australian rules footballer for the South Adelaide Football Club in the SANFL. Palmer holds the games record for South Adelaide.

References

South Adelaide Football Club players
1951 births
Living people
South Australian Football Hall of Fame inductees